Coronel Dorrego Partido is a partido on the southern coast of Buenos Aires Province in Argentina.

Economy
The economy of Coronel Dorrego Partido is dominated by agriculture. The mainstays of agricultural production are cereals, dairy products, and beef.

Tourism
Marisol is a coastal resort which is popular with tourists from Gran Buenos Aires.

Sport
 Club Atlético Ferroviario
 Independiente de Coronel Dorrego
 Club Social y Deportivo San Martín
 Club Social

Settlements
 Aparicio
 Barrio Maritimo
 Coronel Dorrego
 El Perdido
 El Zorro
 Faro
 Irene
 Marisol
 Oriente
 San Román
 Calvo
 Gil
 Nicolás Descalzi.
 Paraje La Gloria
 Zubiaurre

External links

 Dorrego Website
 HCD Website
 Federal Website

1887 establishments in Argentina
Partidos of Buenos Aires Province